The Second Battle of Orléans was a battle of the Franco-Prussian War of 1870.  It took place on December 3 and 4, 1870 and was part of the Loire Campaign.  The Germans recaptured Orléans, which had been retaken by the French on November 11, 1870 after the Battle of Coulmiers, and divided the French Army of the Loire in two. Future king of Serbia, Peter, took part in the battle on the French side. The French lost 19,000 men in two days of combat, including 12,000 prisoners as well as 74 guns and four gunboats. German manpower losses amounted to 1,746, of which 353 killed or dead of wounds, 1,327 wounded and 67 missing. The Germans lost 368 horses, including 175 killed, 183 wounded and 10 missing.

Citations

References

von Moltke, Helmuth, The Franco-German war of 1870-71, London: J. R. Osgood, McIlvaine & co. 1891 p29-41
 
 

O
Orleans 1870
1870 in France
Conflicts in 1870
History of Orléans
December 1870 events